Choong Ewe Leong (5 April 1929 – 10 September 2011) was a former Malaysian badminton player and politician.

Career 
With his younger brother, the charismatic Eddy Choong, he captured men's doubles titles at the prestigious All-England Championships in 1951, 1952, and 1953. They were finalists in 1954, 1955, and 1957. He shared the All-England mixed doubles crown with June White (Timperly) in 1953 and they were finalists in 1955. Between 1949 and 1957 Choong won national open titles in most of the European nations that held such tournaments. In part, because he resided in Great Britain during most of his badminton prime, David Choong never represented Malaya in the coveted Thomas Cup (world team) competition. He was inducted into the International Badminton Hall of Fame in 1998.

Politics
Choong was a Penang State Legislative Assemblyman for Air Itam from 1974 to 1978. He also contested in the 1964 for the Tanjong parliamentary seat as an Alliance coalition candidate of Malaysian Chinese Association (MCA) and 1990 general election for the Bukit Bendera parliamentary seat as Barisan Nasional coalition candidate of Parti Gerakan Rakyat Malaysia (Gerakan).

Death
Choong died on 10 September 2011 in Tanjung Tokong. He was 82.

Honour

Honour of Malaysia
  : Member of the Order of the Defender of the Realm (A.M.N.) (1968)

Achievements

International tournaments 
Men's singles

Men's doubles

Mixed doubles

References

1929 births
2011 deaths
People from Penang
Sportspeople from Penang
Malaysian sportspeople of Chinese descent
Former Malaysian Chinese Association politicians
Parti Gerakan Rakyat Malaysia politicians
Members of the Penang State Legislative Assembly
Malaysian sportsperson-politicians
Malaysian male badminton players
Members of the Order of the Defender of the Realm